This is a list of small arms—including pistols, shotguns, sniper rifles, submachine guns, personal defense weapons, assault rifles, battle rifles, designated marksman rifles, carbines, machine guns, flamethrowers, multiple-barrel firearms, grenade launchers, and anti-tank rifles—that includes variants.

List

 Baikal
 Pistols
 Baikal-441	(Soviet Union - Semi-Automatic Pistol - .25ACP: Civilian market PSM pistol)
 Baikal-442	(Soviet Union - Semi-Automatic Pistol - 9×18mm: Civilian market Makarov PM)
 Baikal MCM	(Soviet Union - Semi-Automatic Pistol - .22 LR)
 Rifles
 Baikal MP-141K	(Russia - Semi-Auto Carbine - .22 LR, .22 Magnum)
 Shotguns
 Baikal MP-153	(Russia - Semi-Automatic Shotgun - 12 Gauge)
 Bajouzutsu revolver
 Baksan PDW	(Russia - Personal Defence Weapon - 9×18mm High Impulse)
 Bang M1922 rifle	(US, Denmark - Semi-Automatic Rifle - 6.5mm Krag, .30-'06 Springfield)
 Barrett Firearms Manufacturing
 Machine Guns
 Barrett M240LW	(US - General-Purpose Machine Gun - 7.62×51mm NATO)
 Rifles
 Barrett M82	(US - Semi-Automatic Anti-Materiel Rifle - .50 BMG)
 Barrett M82A1	(US - Semi-Automatic Anti-Materiel Rifle - .50 BMG)
 Barrett M82A1A	(US - Semi-Automatic Anti-Materiel Rifle - .50 BMG)
 Barrett M82A1M/M107	(US - Semi-Automatic Anti-Materiel Rifle - .50 BMG)
 Barrett M107A1	(US - Semi-Automatic Anti-Materiel Rifle - .50 BMG) 
 Barrett M107CQ	(US - Semi-Automatic Anti-Materiel Rifle - .50 BMG)
 Barrett XM109	(US - Semi-Automatic Anti-Materiel Rifle - 25×59mm)
 Barrett M82A2	(US - Semi-Automatic Anti-Materiel Rifle - .50 BMG)
 Barrett M82A3	(US - Semi-Automatic Anti-Materiel Rifle - .50 BMG)
 Barrett M90	(US - Bolt-Action Anti-Materiel Rifle - .50 BMG)
 Barrett M95	(US - Bolt-Action Anti-Materiel Rifle - .50 BMG)
 Barrett M98	(US - Semi-Automatic Sniper Rifle - .338 Lapua Magnum: Prototype)
 Barrett M98B	(US - Bolt-Action Sniper Rifle - .338 Lapua Magnum)
 Barrett MRAD	(US - Bolt-Action Sniper Rifle - .338 Lapua Magnum)
 Barrett MRAD PSR	(US - Bolt-Action Sniper Rifle - .338 Lapua Magnum)
 Barrett M99	(US - Bolt-Action Anti-Materiel Rifle - .416 Barrett, .50 BMG)
 Barrett M468	(US - Semi-Automatic Rifle - 6.8×43mm SPC)
 Barrett M468A1	(US - Semi-Automatic Rifle - 6.8×43mm SPC)
 Barrett REC7	(US - Semi-Automatic Rifle - 5.56×45mm NATO, 6.8×43mm SPC)
 Barrett XM500	(US - Bolt-Action Anti-Materiel Rifle - .50 BMG)
 Bataan Modelo 71	(Argentina - Pump-Action Shotgun - 12 Gauge: Ithaca 37 copy)
 Bauer Automatic	(US - Semi-Automatic Pistol - .25 ACP: Baby Browning Copy)
 BCM Europearms Barrel Block
 BCM Europearms Bench Rest
 BCM Europearms Extreme
 BCM Europearms Extreme M.A.R.R.
 BCM Europearms Extreme STD
 BCM Europearms F-Class Open
 BCM Europearms F-Class TR
 BCM Europearms Hunter Bench Rest
 BCM Europearms Hunter Match
 BCM Europearms Hunter Field
 BCM Europearms M.A.R.R.
 BCM Europearms SLR
 BCM Europearms TMR
 BCM Europearms USR
 Beaumont M1871 (Dutch - Bolt-Action Rifle—11.3x51R)
 Beholla Pistol	(German Empire - Semi-Automatic Pistol - .32 ACP)
 Belgian M1871 Trooper's Revolver	(Belgium - Revolver - 11×17.5mm French Ordnance)
 Belgian M1878 Officer's Revolver	(Belgium - Revolver - 9×23mmR Nagant)
 Belgian M1883 NCO's Revolver	(Belgium - Revolver - 9×23mmR Nagant)
 Bendix Hyde carbine	(US - Carbine - .30 Carbine)
 Benelli
 Pistols
 Benelli B76	(Italy - Semi-Automatic Pistol - 7.65×21mm Parabellum, 9×18mm Ultra, 9×19mm Parabellum)
 Benelli B82	(Italy - Semi-Automatic Pistol - 7.65×21mm Parabellum, 9×18mm Ultra, 9×19mm Parabellum)
 Benelli B82 Sport	(Italy - Semi-Automatic Pistol - 7.65×21mm Parabellum)
 Shotguns
 Benelli Córdoba	(Italy - Semi-Automatic Shotgun - 12 Gauge, 20 Gauge)
 Benelli Legacy	(Italy - Semi-Automatic Shotgun - 12 Gauge, 20 Gauge, 28 Gauge)
 Benelli M1	(Italy - Semi-Automatic Shotgun - 12 Gauge)
 Benelli M1 Entry Gun	(Italy - Semi-Automatic Shotgun - 12 Gauge)
 Benelli M1 Super 90	(Italy - Semi-Automatic Shotgun - 12 Gauge)
 Benelli M1 Super 90 Field	(Italy - Semi-Automatic Shotgun - 12 Gauge)
 Benelli M1 Tactical	(Italy - Semi-Automatic Shotgun - 12 Gauge)
 Benelli M3	(Italy - Semi-Automatic/Pump-Action Shotgun - 12 Gauge)
 Benelli M3 Super 90	(Italy - Semi-Automatic/Pump-Action Shotgun - 12 Gauge)
 Benelli M3T	(Italy - Semi-Automatic/Pump-Action Shotgun - 12 Gauge)
 Benelli M4 Super 90	(Italy - Semi-Automatic Shotgun - 12 Gauge)
 Benelli Montefeltro	(Italy - Semi-Automatic Shotgun - 12 Gauge, 20 Gauge)
 Benelli Centro	(Italy - Semi-Automatic Shotgun - 12 Gauge, 20 Gauge)
 Benelli Nova	(Italy - Pump-Action Shotgun - 12 Gauge, 20 Gauge)
 Benelli Raffaello	(Italy - Semi-Automatic Shotgun - 12 Gauge)
 Benelli Super Black Eagle	(Italy - Semi-Automamtic Shotgun - 12 Gauge)
 Benelli Supernova	(Italy - Pump-Action Shotgun - 12 Gauge)
 Benelli Ultra Lite	(Italy - Semi-Automatic Shotgun - 12 Gauge)
 Benelli Vinci	(Italy - Semi-Automatic Shotgun - 12 Gauge)
 Berdan rifle	(US/Russia - Single-Shot Rifle - 7.62×54mmR, 10.75×58 mmR, .42 Berdan)
 Berdan I	(US/Russia - Single-Shot Rifle - 7.62×54mmR, 10.75×58 mmR, .42 Berdan)
 Berdan II	(US/Russia - Single-Shot Rifle - 7.62×54mmR, 10.75×58 mmR, .42 Berdan)
 Beretta
 Machine Guns
 AR70/78	(Italy - Light Machine Gun - 5.56×45mm NATO)
 AR70/84	(Italy - Light Machine Gun - 5.56×45mm NATO)
 AS70/90	(Italy - Light Machine Gun - 5.56×45mm NATO)
 MG42/59	(Italy - General-Purpose Machine Gun - 7.62×51mm NATO: Licensed Production Rheinmetall MG1A2)
 Pistols
 Beretta 20 Bobcat	(Italy, US - Subcompact Semi-Automatic Pistol - .25 ACP)
 Beretta 21A Bobcat	(Italy, US - Subcompact Semi-Automatic Pistol - .22 LR, .25 ACP)
 Beretta 81 Series
 Beretta 81B Cheetah	(Italy - Compact Semi-Automatic Pistol - .32 ACP)
 Beretta 81FS Cheetah	(Italy - Compact Semi-Automatic Pistol - .32 ACP)
 Beretta 82 Cheetah	(Italy - Compact Semi-Automatic Pistol - .32 ACP)
 Beretta 82B Cheetah		(Italy - Compact Semi-Automatic Pistol - .32 ACP)
 Beretta 83 Cheetah	(Italy - Compact Semi-Automatic Pistol - .380 ACP)
 Beretta 83F Cheetah	(Italy - Compact Semi-Automatic Pistol - .380 ACP)
 Beretta 83FS Cheetah	(Italy - Compact Semi-Automatic Pistol - .380 ACP)
 Beretta 84 Cheetah	(Italy - Compact Semi-Automatic Pistol - .380 ACP)
 Beretta 84B Cheetah	(Italy - Compact Semi-Automatic Pistol - .380 ACP)
 Beretta 84BB Cheetah	(Italy - Compact Semi-Automatic Pistol - .380 ACP)
 Beretta 84F Cheetah	(Italy - Compact Semi-Automatic Pistol - .380 ACP)
 Beretta 84FS Cheetah	(Italy - Compact Semi-Automatic Pistol - .380 ACP)
 Beretta 85 Cheetah	(Italy - Compact Semi-Automatic Pistol - .380 ACP)
 Beretta 85B Cheetah	(Italy - Compact Semi-Automatic Pistol - .380 ACP)
 Beretta 85BB Cheetah	(Italy - Compact Semi-Automatic Pistol - .380 ACP)
 Beretta 85F Cheetah	(Italy - Compact Semi-Automatic Pistol - .380 ACP)
 Beretta 85FS Cheetah	(Italy - Compact Semi-Automatic Pistol - .380 ACP)
 Beretta 86 Cheetah		(Italy - Compact Semi-Automatic Pistol - .380 ACP)
 Beretta 86FS Cheetah	(Italy - Compact Semi-Automatic Pistol - .380 ACP)
 Beretta 87 Cheetah	(Italy - Compact Semi-Automatic Pistol - .22 LR)
 Beretta 87LB Cheetah	(Italy - Compact Semi-Automatic Pistol - .22 LR)
 Beretta 87BB Cheetah	(Italy - Compact Semi-Automatic Pistol - .22 LR)
 Beretta 87BB/LB Cheetah	(Italy - Compact Semi-Automatic Pistol - .22 LR)
 Beretta 89	(Italy - Compact Semi-Automatic Pistol - .22 LR)
 Beretta 92 Models
 Beretta 92	(Italy - Semi-Automatic Pistol - 9×19mm Parabellum)
 Beretta 92A1	(Italy -  Semi-Automatic Pistol - 9×19mm Parabellum)
 Beretta 92CB	(Italy -  Semi-Automatic Pistol - 9×19mm Parabellum)
 Beretta 92D	(Italy - Semi-Automatic Pistol - 9×19mm Parabellum)
 Beretta 92DS	(Italy - Semi-Automatic Pistol - 9×19mm Parabellum)
 Beretta 92D Brigadier	(Italy - Semi-Automatic Pistol - 9×19mm Parabellum)
 Beretta 92D Compact L	(Italy - Compact Semi-Automatic Pistol - 9×19mm Parabellum)
 Beretta 92D Vertec	(Italy - Semi-Automatic Pistol - 9×19mm Parabellum)
 Beretta 92F/FS	(Italy - Semi-Automatic Pistol - 9×19mm Parabellum)
 M9 Pistol	(Italy/US - Semi-Automatic Pistol - 9×19mm Parabellum)
 Beretta 92FS Brigadier	(Italy - Semi-Automatic Pistol - 9×19mm Parabellum)
 Beretta 92FS Centurion	(Italy - Semi-Automatic Pistol - 9×19mm Parabellum)
 Beretta 92FS Compact L	(Italy - Compact Semi-Automatic Pistol - 9×19mm Parabellum)
 Beretta 92FS Compact Type M	(Italy - Compact Semi-Automatic Pistol - 9×19mm Parabellum)
 Beretta 92FS Competition	(Italy - Semi-Automatic Pistol - 9×19mm Parabellum)
 Beretta 92FS Target	(Italy - Semi-Automatic Pistol - 9×19mm Parabellum)
 Beretta 92FS Vertec	(Italy - Semi-Automatic Pistol - 9×19mm Parabellum)
 GIAT PAMAS-G1	(France, Italy - Semi-Automatic Pistol - 9×19mm Parabellum)
 Beretta 92G	(Italy - Semi-Automatic Pistol - 9×19mm Parabellum)
 Beretta 92G Centurion	(Italy - Semi-Automatic Pistol - 9×19mm Parabellum)
 Beretta 92G Elite I	(Italy - Semi-Automatic Pistol - 9×19mm Parabellum)
 Beretta 92G Elite IA	(Italy - Semi-Automatic Pistol - 9×19mm Parabellum)
 Beretta 92G Elite II	(Italy - Semi-Automatic Pistol - 9×19mm Parabellum)
 Beretta 92G-SD	(Italy - Semi-Automatic Pistol - 9×19mm Parabellum)
 Beretta 92G Vertec	(Italy - Semi-Automatic Pistol - 9×19mm Parabellum)
 Beretta 92S	(Italy - Semi-Automatic Pistol - 9×19mm Parabellum)
 Beretta 92SB	(Italy - Semi-Automatic Pistol - 9×19mm Parabellum)
 Beretta 92SB Compact	(Italy - Compact Semi-Automatic Pistol - 9×19mm Parabellum)
 Beretta 92SB-F	(Italy - Semi-Automatic Pistol - 9×19mm Parabellum)
 Beretta 92 Billennium	(Italy - Semi-Automatic Pistol - 9×19mm Parabellum)
 Beretta 92 Combat	(Italy - Semi-Automatic Pistol - 9×19mm Parabellum)
 Beretta 92 Stock	(Italy - Semi-Automatic Pistol - 9×19mm Parabellum)
 Beretta 93R	(Italy - Machine Pistol - 9×19mm Parabellum)
 Beretta 96	(Italy - Semi-Automatic Pistol - .40 S&W)
 Beretta 96D	(Italy - Semi-Automatic Pistol - .40 S&W)
 Beretta 96DS	(Italy - Semi-Automatic Pistol - .40 S&W)
 Beretta 96D Brigadier	(Italy - Semi-Automatic Pistol - .40 S&W)
 Beretta 96D Vertec	(Italy - Semi-Automatic Pistol - .40 S&W)
 Beretta 96G	(Italy - Semi-Automatic Pistol - .40 S&W)
 Beretta 96G-SD	(Italy - Semi-Automatic Pistol - .40 S&W)
 Beretta 96G Elite	(Italy - Semi-Automatic Pistol - .40 S&W)
 Beretta 96G Elite I	(Italy - Semi-Automatic Pistol - .40 S&W)
 Beretta 96G Elite IA	(Italy - Semi-Automatic Pistol - .40 S&W)
 Beretta 96G Elite II	(Italy - Semi-Automatic Pistol - .40 S&W)
 Beretta 96G Vertec	(Italy - Semi-Automatic Pistol - .40 S&W)
 Beretta 96 Brigadier	(Italy - Semi-Automatic Pistol - .40 S&W)
 Beretta 96 Special	(Italy - Semi-Automatic Pistol - .40 S&W)
 Beretta 96 Vertec	(Italy - Semi-Automatic Pistol - .40 S&W)
 Beretta 98 Series
 Beretta 98	(Italy - Semi-Automatic Pistol - 7.65×21mm Parabellum)
 Beretta 98SB Compact	(Italy - Compact Semi-Automatic Pistol - 7.65×21mm Parabellum)
 Beretta 98FS	(Italy - Semi-Automatic Pistol - 9×21mm IMI)
 Beretta 98FS Brigadier	(Italy - Semi-Automatic Pistol - 9×21mm IMI)
 Beretta 98FS Combat	(Italy - Semi-Automatic Pistol - 9×21mm IMI)
 Beretta 98FS Competition	(Italy - Semi-Automatic Pistol - 9×21mm IMI)
 Beretta 98FS Target	(Italy - Semi-Automatic Pistol - 9×21mm IMI)
 Beretta 98G Elite II	(Italy - Semi-Automatic Pistol - 9×21mm IMI)
 Beretta 98 Billennium	(Italy - Semi-Automatic Pistol - 9×21mm IMI)
 Beretta 418	(Italy - Subcompact Semi-Automatic Pistol - .25 ACP)
 Beretta 318	(Italy - Subcompact Semi-Automatic Pistol - .25 ACP)
 Beretta M1920	(Italy - Subcompact Semi-Automatic Pistol - .25 ACP)
 Beretta M1926	(Italy - Subcompact Semi-Automatic Pistol - .25 ACP)
 950 Jetfire	(Italy, Brazil, US - Subcompact Semi-Automatic Pistol - .22 Short, .25 ACP)
 950B Jetfire	(Italy, Brazil, US - Subcompact Semi-Automatic Pistol - .22 Short, .25 ACP)
 950BS Jetfire	(Italy, Brazil, US - Subcompact Semi-Automatic Pistol - .22 Short, .25 ACP)
 Beretta 3032 Tomcat	(Italy - Subcompact Semi-Automatic Pistol - .32 ACP)
 Beretta 3032 Alleycat	(Italy - Subcompact Semi-Automatic Pistol - .32 ACP)
 Beretta 3032 Tomcat Inox	(Italy - Subcompact Semi-Automatic Pistol - .32 ACP)
 Beretta 8000 Series
 Beretta 8000 Cougar D	(Italy - Compact Semi-Automatic Pistol - 9×19mm Parabellum)
 Beretta 8000 Cougar F	(Italy - Compact Semi-Automatic Pistol - 9×19mm Parabellum)
 Beretta 8000 Cougar G	(Italy - Compact Semi-Automatic Pistol - 9×19mm Parabellum)
 Beretta 8000 Mini Cougar	(Italy - Subcompact Semi-Automatic Pistol - 9×19mm Parabellum)
 Beretta 8000F	(Italy - Compact Semi-Automatic Pistol - 9×19mm Parabellum, 9×21mm IMI, .41 Action Express)
 Beretta 8000F Cougar D	(Italy - Compact Semi-Automatic Pistol - 9×19mm Parabellum, 9×21mm IMI, .41 Action Express)
 Beretta 8000F Cougar F	(Italy - Compact Semi-Automatic Pistol - 9×19mm Parabellum, 9×21mm IMI, .41 Action Express)
 Beretta 8000F Cougar G	(Italy - Compact Semi-Automatic Pistol - 9×19mm Parabellum, 9×21mm IMI, .41 Action Express)
 Beretta 8000L	(Italy - Subcompact Semi-Automatic Pistol - 9×19mm Parabellum)
 Beretta 8000L Cougar D	(Italy - Subcompact Semi-Automatic Pistol - 9×19mm Parabellum)
 Beretta 8000L Cougar F	(Italy - Subcompact Semi-Automatic Pistol - 9×19mm Parabellum)
 Beretta 8000L Cougar G	(Italy - Subcompact Semi-Automatic Pistol - 9×19mm Parabellum)
 Beretta 8000L Type P	(Italy - Subcompact Semi-Automatic Pistol - 9×19mm Parabellum)
 Beretta 8000L Type P Cougar D	(Italy - Subcompact Semi-Automatic Pistol - 9×19mm Parabellum)
 Beretta 8000L Type P Cougar F	(Italy - Subcompact Semi-Automatic Pistol - 9×19mm Parabellum)
 Beretta 8000L Type P Cougar G	(Italy - Subcompact Semi-Automatic Pistol - 9×19mm Parabellum)
 Beretta 8040	(Italy - Compact Semi-Automatic Pistol - .40 S&W)
 Beretta 8040 Cougar D	(Italy - Compact Semi-Automatic Pistol - .40 S&W)
 Beretta 8040 Cougar F	(Italy - Compact Semi-Automatic Pistol - .40 S&W)
 Beretta 8040 Cougar G	(Italy - Compact Semi-Automatic Pistol - .40 S&W)
 Beretta 8040 Mini Cougar	(Italy - Subcompact Semi-Automatic Pistol - .40 S&W)
 Beretta 8045	(Italy - Compact Semi-Automatic Pistol - .45 ACP)
 Beretta 8045 Cougar D	(Italy - Compact Semi-Automatic Pistol - .45 ACP)
 Beretta 8045 Cougar F	(Italy - Compact Semi-Automatic Pistol - .45 ACP)
 Beretta 8045 LAPD	(Italy - Compact Semi-Automatic Pistol - .45 ACP)
 Beretta 8045 Cougar G	(Italy - Compact Semi-Automatic Pistol - .45 ACP)
 Beretta 8045 Mini Cougar	(Italy - Subcompact Semi-Automatic Pistol - .45 ACP)
 Beretta 8357	(Italy - Compact Semi-Automatic Pistol - .357 SIG)
 Beretta Beretta8357 Cougar D	(Italy - Compact Semi-Automatic Pistol - .357 SIG)
 Beretta 8357 Cougar F	(Italy - Compact Semi-Automatic Pistol - .357 SIG)
 Beretta 8357 Cougar G	(Italy - Compact Semi-Automatic Pistol - .357 SIG)
 9000 Series
 Beretta 9000S Type D	(Italy - Compact Semi-Automatic Pistol)
 Beretta 9000S D9	(Italy - Compact Semi-Automatic Pistol - 9×19mm Parabellum)
 Beretta 9000S D40	(Italy - Compact Semi-Automatic Pistol - .40 S&W)
 Beretta 9000S Type F	(Italy - Compact Semi-Automatic Pistol)
 Beretta 9000S F9	(Italy - Compact Semi-Automatic Pistol - 9×19mm Parabellum)
 Beretta 9000S F40	(Italy - Compact Semi-Automatic Pistol - .40 S&W)
 Beretta M1923	(Italy - Semi-Automatic Pistol - 9×19mm Glisenti)
 Beretta M1915	(Italy - Semi-Automatic Pistol - .32 ACP, .380 ACP, 9×19mm Glisenti)
 M1915/19	(Italy - Semi-Automatic Pistol - .32 ACP)
 Beretta M1931	(Italy - Semi-Automatic Pistol - .32 ACP)
 Beretta M1932	(Italy - Semi-Automatic Pistol - .32 ACP, .380 ACP)
 Beretta M1934	(Italy - Compact Semi-Automatic Pistol - .32 ACP, .380 ACP)
 Beretta M1935	(Italy - Compact Semi-Automatic Pistol - .32 ACP)
 Beretta M1948	(Italy - Semi-Automatic Pistol - .22 LR)
 Beretta M948B	(Italy - Semi-Automatic Pistol - .22 LR)
 Beretta M1951	(Italy - Semi-Automatic Pistol - 9×19mm Parabellum)
 Beretta M951-A	(Italy - Machine Pistol - 9×19mm Parabellum)
 Beretta M951-R	(Italy - Machine Pistol - 9×19mm Parabellum)
 Beretta M951-S	(Italy - Semi-Automatic Pistol - 9×19mm Parabellum)
 Beretta M952	(Italy - Semi-Automatic Pistol - 7.65×21mm Parabellum)
 Beretta M952-S	(Italy - Semi-Automatic Pistol - 7.65×21mm Parabellum)
 Beretta M1950	(Italy - Semi-Automatic Pistol - 9×19mm Parabellum: Prototype)
 Beretta Model 104	(Italy - Semi-Automatic Pistol - 9×19mm Parabellum)
 Helwan 951	(Egypt - Semi-Automatic Pistol - 9×19mm Parabellum)
 Beretta Model 70	(Italy - Semi-Automatic Pistol - .22 LR, .32 ACP)
 Beretta Model 70S	(Italy - Semi-Automatic Pistol - .22 LR, .380 ACP)
 Beretta Model 71	(Italy - Semi-Automatic Pistol - .22 LR)
 Beretta Model 72	(Italy - Semi-Automatic Pistol - .22 LR)
 Beretta Model 73	(Italy - Semi-Automatic Pistol - .22 LR)
 Beretta Model 74	(Italy - Semi-Automatic Pistol - .22 LR)
 Beretta Model 100	(Italy - Semi-Automatic Pistol - .32 ACP)
 Beretta Model 75	(Italy - Semi-Automatic Pistol - .22 LR)
 Beretta Model 76	(Italy - Semi-Automatic Pistol - .22 LR)
 Beretta Model 102	(Italy - Semi-Automatic Pistol - .22 LR)
 Beretta Model 80	(Italy - Semi-Automatic Pistol - .22 Short)
 Beretta Model 90	(Italy - Semi***Beretta 418	(Italy - Subcompact Semi-Automatic Pistol - .25 ACP)
 Beretta 318	(Italy - Subcompact Semi-Automatic Pistol - .25 ACP)
 Beretta M1920	(Italy - Subcompact Semi-Automatic Pistol - .25 ACP)
 Beretta M1926	(Italy - Subcompact Semi-Automatic Pistol - .25 ACP)-Automatic Pistol - .32 ACP)
 Beretta Model 99	(Italy - Semi-Automatic Pistol - 7.65×21mm Parabellum)
 Beretta Px4 Storm	(Italy - Semi-Automatic Pistol - 9×19mm Parabellum, 9×21mm IMI, .40 S&W, .45 ACP)
 Beretta Px4 Storm Compact	(Italy - Compact Semi-Automatic Pistol - 9×19mm Parabellum, 9×21mm IMI, .40 S&W, .45 ACP)
 Beretta Px4 Storm Compact Type C	(Italy - Compact Semi-Automatic Pistol - 9×19mm Parabellum, 9×21mm IMI, .40 S&W, .45 ACP)
 Beretta Px4 Storm Compact Type D	(Italy - Compact Semi-Automatic Pistol - 9×19mm Parabellum, 9×21mm IMI, .40 S&W, .45 ACP)
 Beretta Px4 Storm Compact Type F	(Italy - Compact Semi-Automatic Pistol - 9×19mm Parabellum, 9×21mm IMI, .40 S&W, .45 ACP)
 Beretta Px4 Storm Compact Type G	(Italy - Compact Semi-Automatic Pistol - 9×19mm Parabellum, 9×21mm IMI, .40 S&W, .45 ACP)
 Beretta Px4 Storm Subcompact	(Italy - Subcompact Semi-Automatic Pistol - 9×19mm Parabellum, 9×21mm IMI, .40 S&W, .45 ACP)
 Beretta Px4 Storm Subcompact Type C	(Italy - Subcompact Semi-Automatic Pistol - 9×19mm Parabellum, 9×21mm IMI, .40 S&W, .45 ACP)
 Beretta Px4 Storm Subcompact Type D	(Italy - Subcompact Semi-Automatic Pistol - 9×19mm Parabellum, 9×21mm IMI, .40 S&W, .45 ACP)
 Beretta Px4 Storm Subcompact Type F	(Italy - Subcompact Semi-Automatic Pistol - 9×19mm Parabellum, 9×21mm IMI, .40 S&W, .45 ACP)
 Beretta Px4 Storm Subcompact Type G	(Italy - Subcompact Semi-Automatic Pistol - 9×19mm Parabellum, 9×21mm IMI, .40 S&W, .45 ACP)
 Beretta Px4 Storm Type C	(Italy - Semi-Automatic Pistol - 9×19mm Parabellum, 9×21mm IMI, .40 S&W, .45 ACP)
 Beretta Px4 Storm Type D	(Italy - Semi-Automatic Pistol - 9×19mm Parabellum, 9×21mm IMI, .40 S&W, .45 ACP)
 Beretta Px4 Storm Type F	(Italy - Semi-Automatic Pistol - 9×19mm Parabellum, 9×21mm IMI, .40 S&W, .45 ACP)
 Beretta Px4 Storm Type G	(Italy - Semi-Automatic Pistol - 9×19mm Parabellum, 9×21mm IMI, .40 S&W, .45 ACP)
 Beretta U22 NEOS	(Italy - Semi-Automatic Pistol - .22 LR)
 Revolvers
 Model 1	(Italy - Double-Action Revolver - 9×19mm Parabellum, .357 Magnum)
 PR-71	(Italy - Double-Action Revolver - .22 LR, .38 Special)
 Beretta Stampede	(Italy - Single-Action Revolver - .45 Long Colt)
 Beretta Stampede Bisley	(Italy - Single-Action Revolver - .45 Long Colt)
 Beretta Stampede Buntline Carbine	(Italy - Single-Action Revolving Rifle - .45 Long Colt)
 Beretta Stampede Deluxe	(Italy - Single-Action Revolver - .357 Magnum, .45 Long Colt)
 Beretta Stampede Gemini	(Italy - Single-Action Revolver - .45 Long Colt)
 Beretta Stampede Inox	(Italy - Single-Action Revolver - .45 Long Colt)
 Beretta Stampede Old West	(Italy - Single-Action Revolver - .45 Long Colt)
 Beretta Stampede Old West Marshall	(Italy - Single-Action Revolver - .45 Long Colt)
 Beretta Stampede Philadelphia	(Italy - Single-Action Revolver - .45 Long Colt)
 Beretta Laramie (Italy - Single-Action Revolver - .38 Special, .45 Long Colt)
 Rifles
 Beretta AR70/90	(Italy - Assault Rifle - 5.56×45mm NATO)
 Beretta SCP70/90	(Italy - Compact Assault Rifle - 5.56×45mm NATO)
 Beretta SCS70/90	(Italy - Compact Assault Rifle - 5.56×45mm NATO)
 Beretta ARX-160	(Italy - Assault Rifle - 5.45×39mm, 5.56×45mm NATO, 6.8mm Remington SPC, 7.62×39mm)
 Beretta ARX-100	(Italy - Semi-Automatic Rifle - 5.45×39mm, 5.56×45mm NATO, 6.8mm Remington SPC, 7.62×39mm)
 Beretta ARX-160SF	(Italy - Semi-Automatic Rifle - 5.45×39mm, 5.56×45mm NATO, 6.8mm Remington SPC, 7.62×39mm)
 Beretta ARX-160 PDW	(Italy - Personal Defense Weapon - 5.45×39mm, 5.56×45mm NATO, 6.8mm Remington SPC, 7.62×39mm)
 Beretta BM59	(Italy - Battle Rifle - 7.62×51mm NATO)
 Beretta BM58	(Italy - Battle Rifle - 7.62×51mm NATO: Prototype)
 Beretta BM59D	(Italy - Battle Rifle - 7.62×51mm NATO)
 Beretta BM59GL	(Italy - Battle Rifle - 7.62×51mm NATO)
 Beretta BM59R	(Italy - Battle Rifle - 7.62×51mm NATO)
 Beretta BM59SL	(Italy - Semi-Automatic Rifle - 7.62×51mm NATO)
 Beretta BM62	(Italy - Semi-Automatic Rifle - 7.62×51mm NATO)
 Beretta BM59 Mark E	(Italy - Battle Rifle - 7.62×51mm NATO)
 Beretta BM59 Mark Ital	(Italy - Battle Rifle - 7.62×51mm NATO)
 Beretta BM59 Mark Ital-A	(Italy - Battle Rifle - 7.62×51mm NATO)
 Beretta BM59 Mark Ital Para	(Italy - Battle Rifle - 7.62×51mm NATO)
 Beretta BM59 Mark Ital TA	(Italy - Battle Rifle - 7.62×51mm NATO)
 Beretta BM59 Mark I	(Italy - Battle Rifle - 7.62×51mm NATO)
 Beretta BM59 Mark II	(Italy - Battle Rifle - 7.62×51mm NATO)
 Beretta BM59 Mark III	(Italy - Battle Rifle - 7.62×51mm NATO)
 Beretta BM59 Mark IV	(Italy - Battle Rifle - 7.62×51mm NATO)
 Beretta BM60CB	(Italy - Battle Rifle - 7.62×51mm NATO)
 Beretta M1	(Italy - Semi-Automatic Rifle - 7.62×51mm NATO, .30-'06: Licensed production M1 Garand)
 Beretta M1LS	(Italy - Semi-Automatic Carbine - 7.62×51mm NATO, .30-'06)
 Model 455	(Italy - Side by Side Rifle - .375 Holland & Holland Magnum, .416 Rigby, .458 Winchester Magnum, .470 Nitro Express, .500 Nitro Express)
 Beretta Model 500	(Italy - Bolt-Action Rifle - .222 Remington, .223 Remington)
 Beretta Model 501	(Italy - Bolt-Action Rifle - .243 Winchester, .308 Winchester)
 Beretta Model 501 Sniper	(Italy - Bolt-Action Rifle - 7.62×51mm NATO, .243 Winchester, .308 Winchester)
 Beretta Model 502	(Italy - Bolt-Action Rifle - 7mm Remington Magnum, .270 Winchester, .30-'06, .300 Winchester Magnum, .375 Holland & Holland Magnum)
 Beretta Model 502S	(Italy - Bolt-Action Rifle - 7mm Remington Magnum, .270 Winchester, .30-'06, .300 Winchester Magnum, .375 Holland & Holland Magnum)
 Beretta Mato	(Italy - Bolt Action Rifle - 7mm Remington Magnum, .270 Winchester, .280 Remington, .30-'06, .300 Winchester Magnum, .338 Winchester Magnum, .375 Holland & Holland Magnum)
 Beretta P-30 M781	(Italy - Semi-Automatic Carbine - .30 Carbine: Licensed Production M1 Carbine)
 Beretta Rx4 Storm	(Italy - Semi-Automatic Rifle - 5.56×45mm NATO, .223 Remington)
 Beretta S689	(Italy - Over/Under Rifle - 9.3×74mmR, .30-'06, .444 Marlin, 20 Gauge)
 Beretta Sport	(Italy - Semi-Automatic Rifle - .22 LR)
 Beretta Olympia	(Italy - Semi-Automatic Rifle - .22 LR)
 Beretta Olympia X	(Italy - Semi-Automatic Rifle - .22 LR)
 Beretta Super Sport X	(Italy - Semi-Automatic Rifle - .22 LR)
 Beretta SS06	(Italy - Over/Under Rifle - 9.3×74mmR, .375 Holland & Holland Magnum, .458 Winchester Magnum)
 Unione	(Italy - Bolt-Action Rifle - .22 LR)
 Shotguns
 Beretta A300 Outlander	(Italy - Semi-Automatic Shotgun - 12 Gauge)
 Beretta A301	(Italy - Semi-Automatic Shotgun - 12 Gauge, 20 Gauge)
 Beretta A302	(Italy - Semi-Automatic Shotgun - 12 Gauge, 20 Gauge)
 Beretta A303	(Italy - Semi-Automatic Shotgun - 20 Gauge & 12 Gauge)
 Beretta A304	(Italy - Semi-Automatic Shotgun - 12 Gauge)
 Beretta A390	(Italy - Semi-Automatic Shotgun - 12 Gauge)
 Beretta AL390	(Italy - Semi-Automatic Shotgun - 12 Gauge, 20 Gauge)
 Beretta AL391	(Italy- Semi-Automatic Shotgun - 12 Gauge, 20 Gauge)
 Beretta AL391 Teknys	(Italy- Semi-Automatic Shotgun - 12 Gauge, 20 Gauge)
 Beretta AL391 Urika	(Italy- Semi-Automatic Shotgun - 12 Gauge, 20 Gauge)
 Beretta AL391 Xtrema 2   (Italy- Semi-Automatic Shotgun - 12 Gauge)
 Beretta ASE	(Italy - Over/Under Shotgun - 12 Gauge, 20 Gauge)
 ASEL	(Italy - Over/Under Shotgun - 12 Gauge, 20 Gauge)
 Beretta DT-10	(Italy - Over/Under Shotgun - 12 Gauge)
 Beretta M3P	(Italy - Semi-Automatic/Pump-Action Shotgun - 12 Gauge)
 Beretta RS151	(Italy - Pump-Action Shotgun - 12 Gauge)
 Beretta RS200	(Italy - Pump-Action Shotgun - 12 Gauge)
 Beretta RS200-P	(Italy - Pump-Action Shotgun - 12 Gauge)
 Beretta RS202	(Italy - Pump-Action Shotgun - 12 Gauge)
 Beretta RS202-M1	(Italy - Pump-Action Shotgun - 12 Gauge)
 Beretta RS202-M2	(Italy - Pump-Action Shotgun - 12 Gauge)
 Beretta RS202-P	(Italy - Pump-Action Shotgun - 12 Gauge)
 Beretta Silver Pigeon	(Italy - Over/Under Shotgun - .410 Bore, 12 Gauge, 20 Gauge, 28 Gauge)
 Beretta S1	(Italy - Over/Under Shotgun - 12 Gauge)
 Beretta S2	(Italy - Over/Under Shotgun - 12 Gauge)
 Beretta S3	(Italy - Over/Under Shotgun - 12 Gauge)
 Beretta S55	(Italy - Over/Under Shotgun - 12 Gauge, 20 Gauge)
 Beretta S56	(Italy - Over/Under Shotgun - 12 Gauge, 20 Gauge)
 Beretta S57	(Italy - Over/Under Shotgun - 12 Gauge, 20 Gauge)
 Beretta S58	(Italy - Over/Under Shotgun - 12 Gauge)
 Beretta SO	(Italy - Over/Under Shotguns)
 Beretta SO1	(Italy - Over/Under Shotgun - 12 Gauge)
 Beretta SO2	(Italy - Over/Under Shotgun - 12 Gauge)
 Beretta SO3	(Italy - Over/Under Shotgun - 12 Gauge, 20 Gauge)
 Beretta SO4	(Italy - Over/Under Shotgun - 12 Gauge)
 Beretta SO5	(Italy - Over/Under Shotgun - 12 Gauge)
 Beretta SO6	(Italy - Over/Under Shotgun - 12 Gauge)
 Beretta SO9	(Italy - Over/Under Shotgun - .410 Bore, 28 Gauge, 20 Gauge, 16 Gauge, & 12 Gauge)
 Beretta Vandalia	(Italy - Single-Shot Shotgun - 12 Gauge)
 Beretta 012	(Italy - Single-Shot Shotgun - 12 Gauge)
 Beretta 013	(Italy - Single-Shot Shotgun - 12 Gauge)
 Beretta 60	(Italy - Semi-Automatic Shotgun - 12 Gauge)
 Beretta 61	(Italy - Semi-Automatic Shotgun - 12 Gauge)
 Beretta 90	(Italy - Single-Shot Shotgun - 12 Gauge)
 Beretta 101	(Italy - Side by Side Shotgun - 12 Gauge, 16 Gauge, 20 Gauge, 24 Gauge, 28 Gauge, 32 Gauge, 36 Gauge)
 Beretta 103	(Italy - Side by Side Shotgun - 12 Gauge)
 Beretta 104	(Italy - Side by Side Shotgun - 12 Gauge, 16 Gauge, 20 Gauge, 24 Gauge, 28 Gauge)
 Beretta 105	(Italy - Side by Side Shotgun - 12 Gauge, 16 Gauge, 20 Gauge, 24 Gauge)
 Beretta 151	(Italy - Pump-Action Shotgun - 12 Gauge)
 Beretta 211	(Italy - Side by Side Shotgun - 12 Gauge)
 Beretta 305	(Italy - Side by Side Shotgun - 12 Gauge)
 Beretta 309	(Italy - Side by Side Shotgun - 12 Gauge)
 Beretta 311	(Italy - Side by Side Shotgun - 12 Gauge, 16 Gauge, 20 Gauge, 24 Gauge)
 Beretta 312	(Italy - Single-Shot Shotgun - 12 Gauge)
 Beretta 313	(Italy - Single-Shot Shotgun - 12 Gauge)
 Beretta 350	(Italy - Side by Side Shotgun - 12 Gauge)
 Beretta 401	(Italy - Side by Side Shotgun - 12 Gauge, 16 Gauge, 20 Gauge, 24 Gauge, 28 Gauge)
 Beretta 402	(Italy - Side by Side Shotgun - 12 Gauge)
 Beretta 403	(Italy - Side by Side Shotgun - 12 Gauge, 16 Gauge, 20 Gauge, 24 Gauge, 28 Gauge, 32 Gauge)
 Beretta 404	(Italy - Side by Side Shotgun - 12 Gauge, 16 Gauge)
 Beretta 405	(Italy - Side by Side Shotgun - 12 Gauge)
 Beretta 409	(Italy - Side by Side Shotgun - 20 Gauge)
 Beretta 410	(Italy - Side by Side Shotgun - 12 Gauge, 16 Gauge, 20 Gauge, 24 Gauge, 28 Gauge)
 Beretta 411	(Italy - Side by Side Shotgun - 12 Gauge, 16 Gauge, 20 Gauge)
 Beretta 412	(Italy - Single-Shot Shotgun - 12 Gauge)
 Beretta 413	(Italy - Single-Shot Shotgun - 12 Gauge)
 Beretta 414	(Italy - Single-Shot Shotgun - 9mm Long Shot Rimfire)
 Beretta 424	(Italy - Side by Side Shotgun - 12 Gauge, 16 Gauge, 20 Gauge)
 Beretta 425	(Italy - Side by Side Shotgun - 12 Gauge)
 Beretta 426	(Italy - Side by Side Shotgun - 12 Gauge)
 Beretta 427	(Italy - Side by Side Shotgun - 12 Gauge)
 Beretta 450	(Italy - Side by Side Shotgun - 12 Gauge)
 Beretta 451	(Italy - Side by Side Shotgun - 12 Gauge)
 Beretta 452	(Italy - Side by Side Shotgun - 12 Gauge)
 Beretta 470	(Italy - Side by Side Shotgun - 12 Gauge, 20 Gauge)
 Beretta 625	(Italy - Side by Side Shotgun - 12 Gauge)
 Beretta 626	(Italy - Side by Side Shotgun - 12 Gauge)
 Beretta 627	(Italy - Side by Side Shotgun - 12 Gauge)
 Beretta 680	(Italy - Over/Under Shotgun - 12 Gauge)
 Beretta 682	(Italy - Over/Under Shotgun - 12 Gauge)
 Beretta 686	(Italy - Over/Under Shotgun - 12 Gauge, 20 Gauge, 28 Gauge)
 Beretta 687	(Italy - Over/Under Shotgun - .410 Bore, 12 Gauge, 20 Gauge, 28 Gauge)
 Beretta 922	(Italy - Side by Side Shotgun - 12 Gauge)
 Beretta 930	(Italy - Single-Shot Shotgun - 10 Gauge)
 Beretta 1009	(Italy - Side by Side Shotgun - 12 Gauge)
 Beretta 1010	(Italy - Side by Side Shotgun - 12 Gauge, 16 Gauge, 20 Gauge, 24 Gauge)
 Beretta 1011	(Italy - Side by Side Shotgun - 12 Gauge)
 Beretta 1012	(Italy - Single Shot Shotgun - 12 Gauge)
 Beretta 1013	(Italy - Single Shot Shotgun - 12 Gauge)
 Beretta 1050	(Italy - Side by Side Shotgun - 12 Gauge)
 Beretta 1200	(Italy - Semi-Automatic Shotgun - 12 Gauge)
 Beretta 1200F	(Italy - Semi-Automatic Shotgun - 12 Gauge)
 Beretta 1200FP	(Italy - Semi-Automatic Shotgun - 12 Gauge)
 Beretta 1201	(Italy - Semi-Automatic Shotgun - 12 Gauge)
 Beretta 1200F	(Italy - Semi-Automatic Shotgun - 12 Gauge)
 Beretta 1201FP3	(Italy - Semi-Automatic Shotgun - 12 Gauge)
 Beretta 1409	(Italy - Side by Side Shotgun - 12 Gauge)
 Beretta 1930	(Italy - Side by Side Shotgun - 12 Gauge, 16 Gauge, 20 Gauge, 24 Gauge)
 Submachine Guns
 Beretta Cx4 Storm	(Italy - Semi-Automatic Carbine - 9×19mm Parabellum, 9×21mm IMI, .40 S&W, .45 ACP)
 Beretta Mx4 Storm	(Italy - Submachine Gun - 9×19mm Parabellum, .45 ACP)
 Beretta M1918	(Italy - Submachine Gun - 9×19mm Glisenti)
 Beretta Model 18/30	(Italy - Submachine Gune - 9×19mm Glisenti)
 Beretta MAB 38	(Italy - Submachine Gun - 9×19mm Parabellum)
 Beretta MAB 38A	(Italy - Submachine Gun - 9×19mm Parabellum)
 Beretta MAB 38	(Italy - Submachine Gun - 9×19mm Parabellum)
 Beretta MAB 38/42	(Italy - Submachine Gun - 9×19mm Parabellum)
 Beretta MAB 38/43	(Italy - Submachine Gun - 9×19mm Parabellum)
 Beretta MAB 38/44	(Italy - Submachine Gun - 9×19mm Parabellum)
 Beretta MAB 38/49	(Italy - Submachine Gun - 9×19mm Parabellum)
 Beretta Model 2	(Italy - Submachine Gun - 9×19mm Parabellum)
 Beretta Model 4	(Italy - Submachine Gun - 9×19mm Parabellum)
 Beretta M12	(Italy - Submachine Gun - 9×19mm Parabellum)
 Beretta PM12S	(Italy - Submachine Gun - 9×19mm Parabellum)
 Beretta PM12S2	(Italy - Submachine Gun - 9×19mm Parabellum)
 Bernardelli
 Pistols
 Bernardelli 69	(Italy - Semi-Automatic Pistol - .22 LR)
 Bernardelli Mod. USA	(Italy - Semi-Automatic Pistol - .22 LR, .32 ACP, .380 ACP)
 Rifles
 Bernardelli VB-SR	(Italy - Assault Rifle - 5.56×45mm NATO: Licensed production IMI Galil)
 Shotguns
 Bernardelli B4	(Italy - Semi-Automatic/Pump-Action Shotgun - 12 Gauge)
 Bernardelli B4/B	(Italy - Pump-Action Shotgun - 12 Gauge)
 Bernardelli P One	(Italy - Semi-Automatic Pistol - 9×19mm Parabellum, .40 S&W)
 Bernardelli PO-18	(Italy - Semi-Automatic Pistol - 9×19mm Parabellum)
 Bernardelli P0-18 Compact	(Italy - Compact Semi-Automatic Pistol - 9×19mm Parabellum)
 Bernardelli P6	(Italy - Semi-Automatic Pistol - .22 LR, .32 ACP, .380 ACP)
 Bernardelli P8	(Italy - Semi-Automatic Pistol - .22 LR, .32 ACP, .380) 
 Bersa
 Pistols
 Bersa 83	(Argentina - Semi-Automatic Pistol - .380 ACP)
 Bersa 95	(Argentina - Semi-Automatic Pistol - .380 ACP)
 Bersa Thunder Series	(Argentina - Semi-Automatic Pistols)
 Bersa Thunder 9	(Argentina - Semi-Automatic Pistol - 9×19mm Parabellum)
 Bersa Thunder 22	(Argentina - Semi-Automatic Pistol - .22 LR)
 Bersa Thunder 22-6	(Argentina - Semi-Automatic Pistol - .22 LR)
 Bersa Thunder 32	(Argentina - Semi-Automatic Pistol - .32 ACP)
 Bersa Thunder 40	(Argentina - Semi-Automatic Pistol - .40 S&W)
 Bersa Thunder 45	(Argentina - Semi-Automatic Pistol - .45 ACP)
 Bersa Thunder 380	(Argentina - Semi-Automatic Pistol - .380 ACP)
 Bersa Thunder Ultra Compact	(Argentina - Compact Semi-Automatic Pistols)
 Bersa Thunder 9 Ultra Compact	(Argentina - Compact Semi-Automatic Pistol - 9×19mm Parabellum)
 Bersa Thunder 40 Ultra Compact	(Argentina - Compact Semi-Automatic Pistol - .40 S&W)
 Bersa Thunder 45 Ultra Compact	(Argentina - Compact Semi-Automatic Pistol - .45 ACP)
 Berthier Rifles	(France - Bolt-Action Carbines and Rifles)
 Berthier Mle 1890	(France - Bolt-Action Carbine - 8mm Lebel)
 Berthier Mle 1892	(France - Bolt-Action Carbine - 8mm Lebel)
 Berthier Mle 1902	(France - Bolt-Action Rifle - 8mm Lebel)
 Berthier Mle 1907	(France - Bolt-Action Rifle - 8mm Lebel)
 Berthier Mle 1907/15	(France - Bolt-Action Rifle - 7.5×54mm French)
 Mousquetons Berthier	(France - Bolt-Action Carbine - 8mm Lebel)
 Bingham Arms
 Rifles
 Bingham AK 22	(US - Semi-Automatic Rifle - .22 LR)
 Birmingham Small Arms Company
 Rifles
 BSA Autorifle (UK - Semi Automatic Rifle - .303 British)
 Machine Guns
 Lewis Light Machine Gun	(UK - Light Machine Gun - 7.92×57mm Mauser, .30-06 Springfield, .303 British)
 Lewis Gun 12.7mm Variant	(UK - Light Machine Gun - 12.7×81mm)
 Lewis Gun Aircraft Pattern	(UK - Aircraft Mounted Machine Gun - 7.92×57mm Mauser, .30-06 Springfield, .303 British)
 Lewis Gun Anti-Aircraft Configuration	(UK - Anti-Aircraft Machine Gun - 7.92×57mm Mauser, .30-06 Springfield, .303 British)
 Lewis Gun Light Infantry Pattern	(UK - Light Machine Gun - 7.92×57mm Mauser, .30-06 Springfield, .303 British)
 Lewis Gun Mk I	(UK - Light Machine Gun - 7.92×57mm Mauser, .30-06 Springfield, .303 British)
 Lewis Gun Mk II	(UK - Light Machine Gun - 7.92×57mm Mauser, .30-06 Springfield, .303 British)
 Lewis Gun Mk III	(UK - Light Machine Gun - 7.92×57mm Mauser, .30-06 Springfield, .303 British)
 Lewis Gun Mk IV	(UK - Light Machine Gun - 7.92×57mm Mauser, .30-06 Springfield, .303 British)
 Lewis Gun Mk V	(UK - Light Machine Gun - 7.92×57mm Mauser, .30-06 Springfield, .303 British)
 Lewis Gun Short Barreled Variant	(UK - Shortened Light Machine Gun - 7.92×57mm Mauser, .30-06 Springfield, .303 British)
 Submachine Guns
 BSA Welgun	(UK - Submachine Gun - 9×19mm Parabellum)
 Biwarip machine carbine (United Kingdom - Submachine Gun - 9×19mm Parabellum)
 Blaser
 Rifles
 Blaser R93	(Germany - Straight-Pull Bolt-Action Hunting Rifle - 7.62×51mm NATO)
 Blaser R8	(Germany - Straight-Pull Bolt-Action Hunting Rifle - 7.62×51mm NATO)
 Blaser R93 Tactical	(Germany - Straight-Pull Bolt-Action Sniper Rifle)
 Blaser R93 LRS 2	(Germany - Straight-Pull Bolt-Action Sniper Rifle - 6mm Norma BR6.5×55mm, 7.62×51mm NATO, .223 Remington, .300 Winchester Magnum, .308 Winchester)
 Blaser R93 Tactical 2	(Germany - Straight-Pull Bolt-Action Sniper Rifle - .223 Remington, .300 Winchester Magnum, .308 Winchester, .338 Lapua Magnum)
 Blaser R93 Tactical LRT	(Germany - Straight-Pull Bolt-Action Sniper Rifle - 6.5×55mm, 7.62×51mm NATO, .300 Winchester Magnum, .338 Lapua Magnum)
 Shotguns
 Blaser F3	(Germany - Break-Action Shotgun - 12 Gauge, 20 Gauge, 28 Gauge)
 Blunderbuss
 Bofors
 Bofors AGR	(Sweden - Pump-Action Grenade Launcher - 40mm Medium Velocity Grenade)
 Ak 5	(Sweden - Assault Rifle - 5.56×45mm NATO)
 Ak 5B	(Sweden - Assault Rifle - 5.56×45mm NATO)
 Ak 5C	(Sweden - Assault Rifle - 5.56×45mm NATO)
 AK 5CF	(Sweden - Assault Rifle - 5.56×45mm NATO: Prototype)
 Ak 5D	(Sweden - Compact Assault Rifle - 5.56×45mm NATO)
 CGA5C2	(Sweden - Assault Rifle - 5.56×45mm NATO: Prototype)
 CGA5P	(Sweden - Semi-Automatic Rifle - 5.56×45mm NATO)
 Bofors Carl Gustaf
 Rifles
 Carl Gustav M96/38	(Sweden - Bolt-Action Rifle - 6.5×55mm)
 Submachine Guns
 Carl Gustaf M/45	(Sweden - Submachine Gun - 9×19mm Parabellum)
 Carl Gustav M/45B	(Sweden - Submachine Gun - 9×19mm Parabellum)
 Carl Gustav M/45BE	(Sweden - Submachine Gun - 9×19mm Parabellum)
 Carl Gustav M/45BET	(Sweden - Submachine Gun - 9×19mm Parabellum)
 Carl Gustav M/45C	(Sweden - Submachine Gun - 9×19mm Parabellum)
 Carl Gustav M/45S	(Sweden - Submachine Gun - 9×19mm Parabellum: Prototype)
 Borz Submachine Gun	(Chechen Republic of Ichkeria - Submachine Gun - 9×18mm Makarov)
 Breda Meccanica Bresciana
 Machine Guns
 Breda Modello 30 Light Machine Gun	(Kingdom of Italy - Light Machine Gun - 6.5×52mm Mannlicher–Carcano)
 Breda Modello 37 Heavy Machine Gun	(Kingdom of Italy - Heavy Machine Gun - 7.92×57mm Mauser, 8×59mm RB Breda)
 Breda Modello 38 Heavy Machine Gun	(Kingdom of Italy - Vehicle-Mounted Heavy Machine Gun - 7.92×57mm Mauser, 8×59mm RB Breda)
 Rifles
 Breda M1935 PG Rifle	(Kingdom of Italy - Battle Rifle - 6.5×52mm Carcano)
 Bren Ten	(US - Semi-Automatic Pistol)
 Bren Ten API	(US - Semi-Automatic Pistol - 10mm Auto)
 Bren Ten Dual-Master	(US - Semi-Automatic Pistol - 10mm Auto, .45 ACP)
 Bren Ten Initial Issue	(US - Semi-Automatic Pistol - 10mm Auto)
 Bren Ten Marksman Special Match	(US - Semi-Automatic Pistol - .45 ACP)
 Bren Ten MP	(US - Semi-Automatic Pistol - 10mm Auto)
 Bren Ten Pocket Model	(US - Subcompact Semi-Automatic Pistol - 10mm Auto: Prototype)
 Bren Ten Prototype	(US - Semi-Automatic Pistol - 10mm Auto: Prototype)
 Bren Ten SM	(US - Semi-Automatic Pistol - 10mm Auto)
 Bren Ten Special Forces Pistols	(US - Compact Semi-Automatic Pistols)
 Bren Ten Special Forces D	(US - Compact Semi-Automatic Pistol - 10mm Auto)
 Bren Ten Special Forces L	(US - Compact Semi-Automatic Pistol - 10mm Auto)
 Britarms Model 2000	(UK - Semi-Automatic Pistol - .22 LR)
 British Armed Forces Small Arms Designations
 Launchers
 L17A1	(Germany, UK - Underslung Grenade Launcher - 40×46mm Grenade: HK AG36 Variant)
 L17A2	(UK - Underslung Grenade Launcher - 40×46mm Grenade)
 L123A2 UGL	(UK - Underslung Grenade Launcher - 40×46mm Grenade)
 L48A1	(UK - Single-Shot Riot Gun - 37mm Grenade: ARWEN 37 Variant)
 L48A2	(UK - Single-Shot Riot Gun - 37mm Grenade)
 L67A1	(UK - Single-Shot Riot Gun - 37mm Grenade: Arwen 37 Variant)
 Machine Guns
 L3A1	(US, UK - Medium Machine Gun - .30-06: Browning M1919A4 Variant)
 L3A2	(UK - Medium Machine Gun - .303 British)
 L3A4	(UK - Medium Machine Gun - .303 British)
 L3A3	(UK - Medium Machine Gun - .303 British)
 L4A1	(UK - Light Machine Gun - 7.62×51mm NATO: Bren Light Machine Gun Variant)
 L4A2	(UK - Light Machine Gun - 7.62×51mm NATO)
 L4A4	(UK - Light Machine Gun - 7.62×51mm NATO)
 L4A3	(UK - Light Machine Gun - 7.62×51mm NATO)
 L4A5	(UK - Light Machine Gun - 7.62×51mm NATO)
 L4A6	(UK - Light Machine Gun - 7.62×51mm NATO)
 L4A9	(UK - Light Machine Gun - 7.62×51mm NATO)
 L6A1	(UK - Ranging Gun - .50 BMG)
 L11A1	(UK - Ranging Gun - .50 BMG)
 L40A1	(UK - Ranging Gun - .50 BMG)
 L7A1	(Belgium, UK - General-Purpose Machine Gun - 7.62×51mm NATO: FN MAG Variant)
 L7A2	(UK - General-Purpose Machine Gun - 7.62×51mm NATO)
 L112A1	(UK - Helicopter Mounted General-Purpose Machine Gun - 7.62×51mm NATO)
 L8A1	(UK - Vehicle Mounted General-Purpose Machine Gun - 7.62×51mm NATO)
 L8A2	(UK - Vehicle Mounted General-Purpose Machine Gun - 7.62×51mm NATO)
 L37A1	(UK - Vehicle Mounted General-Purpose Machine Gun - 7.62×51mm NATO)
 L37A2	(UK - Vehicle Mounted General-Purpose Machine Gun - 7.62×51mm NATO)
 L19A1	(UK - General-Purpose Machine Gun - 7.62×51mm NATO)
 L20A1	(UK - General-Purpose Machine Gun - 7.62×51mm NATO)
 L20A2	(UK - General-Purpose Machine Gun - 7.62×51mm NATO)
 L44A1	(UK - General-Purpose Machine Gun - 7.62×51mm NATO)
 L43A1	(UK - Ranging Gun - 7.62×51mm NATO)
 L94A1	(US, UK - Vehicle-Mounted Chain Gun - 7.62×51mm NATO: Hughes EX34 Variant)
 L95A1	(UK - Vehicle-Mounted Chain Gun - 7.62×51mm NATO)
 L108A1	(Belgium, UK - Light Machine Gun - 5.56×45mm NATO: FN Minimi Variant)
 L110A1	(Belgium, UK - Shortened Light Machine Gun - 5.56×45mm NATO: FN Minimi Para Variant)
 L111A1	(US, UK - Heavy Machine Gun - .50 BMG: Browning M2HB Variant)
 XL17E1	(United Kingdom of Great Britain and Northern Ireland/United States - British Armed Forces/General Electric - Unknown Date - Heavy Machine Gun - .50 BMG: Variant of the American General Electric M85 heavy machine gun. Never adopted by the British Armed Forces. Prototypes only.)
 XL17E2	(United Kingdom of Great Britain and Northern Ireland/United States - British Armed Forces/General Electric - Unknown Date - Heavy Machine Gun - .50 BMG: Variant of the British XL17E1 heavy machine gun.)
 Pistols
 L9A1	(Belgium, UK - Semi-Automatic Pistol - 9×19mm Parabellum: Browning Hi-Power Variant)
 L9A2	(UK - Semi-Automatic Pistol - 9×19mm Parabellum)
 L9A3	(UK - Semi-Automatic Pistol - 9×19mm Parabellum)
 L11A1	(UK - Semi-Automatic Pistol - 9×19mm Parabellum)
 L47A1	(Germany, UK - Compact Semi-Automatic Pistol - .32 ACP: Walther PP Variant)
 L66A1	(Germany, UK - Semi-Automatic Pistol - .22 Long Rifle: Walther GSP Variant)
 L102A1	(Germany, UK - Compact Semi-Automatic Pistol - 7.65×21mm Parabellum, 9×19mm Parabellum, 9×21mm IMI: Walther P5 Compact Variant)
 L105A1	(Switzerland, UK - Semi-Automatic Pistol - 9×19mm Parabellum, .357 SIG, .40 S&W: SIG Sauer P226 Variant)
 L106A1	(Switzerland, UK - Semi-Automatic Pistol - 9×19mm Parabellum, .357 SIG, .40 S&W)
 L107A1	(Switzerland, UK - Compact Semi-Automatic Pistol - 9×19mm Parabellum, .357 SIG, .40 S&W: SIG Sauer P229 Variant)
 Rifles
 L1A1	(Belgium, UK - Semi-Automatic Rifle - 7.62×51mm NATO: FN FAL Variant)
 L1A2	(UK - Semi-Automatic Rifle - 7.62×51mm NATO)
 L2A1	(UK - Light Machine Gun - 7.62×51mm NATO)
 L2A2	(UK - Light Machine Gun - 7.62×51mm NATO)
 L5A1	(UK - Semi-Automatic Rifle - 7.62×51mm NATO)
 L5A2	(UK - Semi-Automatic Rifle - 7.62×51mm NATO)
 L5A3	(UK - Semi-Automatic Rifle - 7.62×51mm NATO)
 L29A1	(UK - Single-Shot Bolt-Action Rifle - .22 Long Rifle)
 L29A2	(UK - Single-Shot Bolt-Action Rifle - .22 Long Rifle)
 L42A1	(UK - Bolt-Action Sniper Rifle - 7.62×51mm NATO: Lee–Enfield Conversion)
 L42A1	(UK - Bolt-Action Sniper Rifle - 7.62×51mm NATO)
 L81A1	(UK - Bolt-Action Sniper Rifle - 7.62×51mm NATO: Parker Hale M82 Variant)
 L85A1	(UK - Assault Rifle - 5.56×45mm NATO)
 L22A1	(UK - Carbine - 5.56×45mm NATO)
 L22A2	(UK - Carbine - 5.56×45mm NATO)
 L85A2	(UK - Assault Rifle - 5.56×45mm NATO)
 L86A1	(UK - Squad Automatic Weapon - 5.56×45mm NATO)
 L86A2	(UK - Squad Automatic Weapon - 5.56×45mm NATO)
 L96A1	(United Kingdom of Great Britain and Northern Ireland - British Armed Forces/Accuracy International - 1982 - Bolt-Action Sniper Rifle - 7.62×51mm NATO, .308 Winchester: Variant of the British Accuracy International Precision Marksman bolt-action sniper rifle. Replaced the L42A1 bolt-action sniper rifles in service with the British Armed Forces. Features Schmidt & Bender 6×42 telescopic sights.)
 L98A1	(UK - Single-Shot Rifle - 5.56×45mm NATO)
 L100A1	(Germany, UK - Carbine - 7.62×51mm NATO: H&K G3KA4 Variant)
 L101A1	(Germany, UK - Carbine - 5.56×45mm NATO: HK53 Variant)
 L115A1	(United Kingdom of Great Britain and Northern Ireland - British Armed Forces/Accuracy International - Unknown Date - Bolt-Action Sniper Rifle - .338 Lapua Magnum: Variant of the British Accuracy International Arctic Warfare Magnum bolt-action sniper rifle. Features Schmidt & Bender 3-12×50 PM II telescopic sights.)
 L115A3	(United Kingdom of Great Britain and Northern Ireland - British Armed Forces/Accuracy International - 2007 - Bolt-Action Sniper Rifle - .338 Lapua Magnum: Variant of the British L115A1 bolt-action sniper rifle. Features a more modular design than the L115A1.)
 L118A1	(United Kingdom of Great Britain and Northern Ireland - British Armed Forces/Accuracy International - 1991 - Bolt-Action Sniper Rifle - 7.62×51mm NATO, .308 Winchester: Variant of the British Accuracy International Arctic Warfare bolt-action sniper rifle. Features Schmidt & Bender MILITARY MK II 3-12×50 telescopic sights.)
 L119A1	(Canada, UK - Carbine - 5.56×45mm NATO: Colt Canada C8SFW Variant)
 L121A1	(United Kingdom of Great Britain and Northern Ireland - British Armed Forces/Accuracy International - 2002 - Bolt-Action Anti-Materiel Rifle - .50 BMG: Variant of the British Accuracy International Arctic Warfare .50 Folding bolt-action anti-materiel rifle in service with the United Kingdom of Great Britain and Northern Ireland. In use with the British Special Air Service.)
 Shotguns
 L32A1	(US, UK - Semi-Automatic Shotgun - 12 Gauge: Browning Auto-5 Riot Variant)
 L74A1	(US, UK - Shotgun - 12 Gauge: Remington Model 870 Variant)
 Submachine Guns
 L2A1	(UK - Submachine Gun - 9×19mm Parabellum: Sterling Submachine Gun Variant)
 L2A2	(UK - Submachine Gun - 9×19mm Parabellum)
 L2A3	(UK - Submachine Gun - 9×19mm Parabellum)
 L34A1	(UK - Integrally Suppressed Submachine Gun - 9×19mm Parabellum)
 L50A1	(UK - Submachine Gun - 9×19mm Parabellum: Sten Mk II Variant)
 L51A1	(UK - Submachine Gun - 9×19mm Parabellum: Sten Mk III Variant)
 L52A1	(UK - Submachine Gun - 9×19mm Parabellum: Sten Mk V Variant)
 L80A1	(Germany, UK - Compact Submachine Gun - 9×19mm Parabellum: H&K MP5K Variant)
 L90A1	(Germany, UK - Compact Submachine Gun - 9×19mm Parabellum: H&K MP5KA1 Variant)
 L91A1	(Germany, UK - Integrally Suppressed Submachine Gun - 9×19mm Parabellum: H&K MP5-SD3 Variant)
 L92A1	(Germany, UK - Submachine Gun - 9×19mm Parabellum: H&K MP5A3 Variant)
 Brown Bess	(UK - Musket)
 Brown Precision Tactical Elite	(US - Bolt-Acton Sniper Rifle - .308 Winchester)
 John Browning
 Machine Guns
 Browning M2	(US - Heavy Machine Gun - .50 BMG)
 Browning AN/M2	(US - Aircraft Mounted Machine Gun - .50 BMG)
 Browning M213	(US - Aircraft Mounted Machine Gun - .50 BMG)
 Browning XM213	(US - Aircraft Mounted Machine Gun - .50 BMG: Prototype)
 Browning M296	(US - Aircraft Mounted Machine Gun - .50 BMG)
 Browning XM296	(US - Aircraft Mounted Machine Gun - .50 BMG: Prototype)
 Browning AN/M3	(US - Aircraft Mounted Machine Gun - .50 BMG)
 Browning GAU-15/A	(US - Aircraft Mounted Machine Gun - .50 BMG)
 Browning GAU-16/A	(US - Aircraft Mounted Machine Gun - .50 BMG)
 Browning GAU-18/A	(US - Aircraft Mounted Machine Gun - .50 BMG)
 Browning M2A1	(US - Heavy Machine Gun - .50 BMG)
 Browning M2HB	(US - Heavy Machine Gun - .50 BMG)
 Browning M1917	(US - Heavy Machine Gun - .30-'06)
 Browning M1917A1	(US - Heavy Machine Gun - .30-'06)
 Browning M1918	(US - Aircraft Mounted Machine Gun - .30-'06)
 Browning M1918M1	(US - Aircraft Mounted Machine Gun - .30-'06)
 Browning M1918 BAR	(US - Light Machine Gun - .30-'06)
 Browning Automatic Machine Rifle Model 1919	(US - Light Machine Gun - .30-'06)
 Browning Automatic Machine Rifle Model 1924	(US - Light Machine Gun - .30-'06)
 Browning R75	(US - Light Machine Gun - .30-'06)
 Browning R75A	(US - Light Machine Gun - .30-'06)
 Browning M1918A1 BAR	(US - Light Machine Gun - .30-'06)
 Browning M1918A2 BAR	(US - Light Machine Gun - .30-'06)
 Browning M1922 BAR	(US - Light Machine Gun - .30-'06)
 M1919 Browning machine gun
 Browning .30 AN/M2	(US - Aircraft Mounted Machine Gun - .30-'06)
 Browning T33	(US - Aircraft Mounted Machine Gun, Medium Machine Gun - .30-'06)
 Browning .303 Mk II	(US - Medium Machine Gun - .303 British)
 Browning M37	(US - Vehicle Mounted Machine Gun - .30-'06)
 Browning M37A1	(US - Vehicle Mounted Machine Gun - .30-'06)
 Browning M37C	(US - Aircraft Mounted Machine Gun - .30-'06)
 Browning M37E1	(US - Vehicle Mounted Machine Gun - 7.62×51mm NATO: Prototype)
 Browning M37F	(US - Vehicle Mounted Machine Gun - .30-'06: Prototype)
 Browning M1919A1	(US - Medium Machine Gun - .30-'06)
 Browning M1919A2	(US - Medium Machine Gun - .30-'06)
 Browning M1919A3	(US - Medium Machine Gun - .30-'06)
 Browning M1919A4	(US - Medium Machine Gun - .30-'06)
 Browning M1919A4E1	(US - Medium Machine Gun - .30-'06)
 Browning M1919A5	(US - Medium Machine Gun - .30-'06)
 Browning M1919A6	(US - Medium Machine Gun - .30-'06)
 Browning Mk 21 Mod 0	(US - Medium Machine Gun - 7.62×51mm NATO)
 Browning M1921	(US - Heavy Machine Gun - .50 BMG)
 Browning M1921A1	(US - Heavy Machine Gun - .50 BMG)
 Pistols
 FN Baby Browning	(Belgium - Subcompact Semi-Automatic Pistol - .25 ACP)
 Browning BDA	(Belgium - Semi-Automatic Pistol - 9×19mm Parabellum, 9×21mm IMI)
 Browning BDAC	(Belgium - Compact Semi-Automatic Pistol - 9×19mm Parabellum, 9×21mm IMI)
 Browning BDAM	(Belgium - Semi-Automatic Pistol - 9×19mm Parabellum, 9×21mm IMI)
 Browning BDAO	(Belgium - Semi-Automatic Pistol - 9×19mm Parabellum, 9×21mm IMI)
 Browning BDM	(US - Semi-Automatic Pistol - 9×19mm Parabellum)
 Browning Buck Mark	(US - Semi-Automatic Pistol - .22 LR)
 Browning Challenger	(Belgium - Semi-Automatic Pistol - .22 LR)
 Browning Hi-Power	(Belgium - Semi-Automatic Pistol - 9×19mm Parabellum)
 Browning Hi-Power Mk I	(Belgium - Semi-Automatic Pistol - 9×19mm Parabellum)
 Browning Hi-Power Mk I Lightweight	(Belgium - Semi-Automatic Pistol - 9×19mm Parabellum)
 Browning Hi-Power Mk II	(Belgium - Semi-Automatic Pistol - 9×19mm Parabellum)
 Browning Hi-Power Mk III	(Belgium - Semi-Automatic Pistol - 9×19mm Parabellum & .40 S&W)
 Browning Hi-Power-SFS	(Belgium - Semi-Automatic Pistol - 9×19mm Parabellum & .40 S&W)
 Browning Hi-Power Captain	(Belgium - Semi-Automatic Pistol - 9×19mm Parabellum & .40 S&W)
 Browning Hi-Power Practical	(Belgium - Semi-Automatic Pistol - 9×19mm Parabellum & .40 S&W)
 Browning Hi-Power Silver Chrome	(Belgium - Semi-Automatic Pistol - 9×19mm Parabellum & .40 S&W)
 Browning Hi-Power Standard	(Belgium - Semi-Automatic Pistol - 9×19mm Parabellum & .40 S&W)
 Browning Medalist	(Belgium - Semi-Automatic Pistol - .22 LR)
 Rifles
 Browning A-Bolt	(US, Japan - Bolt-Acton Rifle)
 Browning M71	(US, Japan - Lever-Action Rifle - .30'06)
 Browning Model 81 BLR	(US - Lever-Action Rifle - 7mm Remington Magnum, 7mm Winchester Short Magnum, 7mm-08 Remington, .22-250 Remington, .223 Remington, .243 Winchester, .257 Roberts, .270 Winchester, .270 Winchester Short Magnum, .30-06 Springfield, .300 Winchester Magnum, .300 Winchester Short Magnum, .308 Winchester, .325 Winchester Short Magnum, .358 Winchester, .450 Marlin)
 Browning Model 81 Lightning BLR	(US - Lever-Action Rifle - 7mm Remington Magnum, 7mm Winchester Short Magnum, 7mm-08 Remington, .22-250 Remington, .223 Remington, .243 Winchester, .257 Roberts, .270 Winchester, .270 Winchester Short Magnum, .30-06 Springfield, .300 Winchester Magnum, .300 Winchester Short Magnum, .308 Winchester, .325 Winchester Short Magnum, .358 Winchester, .450 Marlin)
 Shotguns
 Browning A-Bolt	(US - Semi-Automatic Shotgun - 12 Gauge)
 Browning Citori	(US, Japan - Over/Under Shotgun - 12 Gauge, 16 Gauge, 20 Gauge, 28 Gauge, .410 Bore)
 Browning Superposed	(US - Over/Under Shotgun - 12 Gauge, 16 Gauge, 20 Gauge, 28 Gauge, .410 Bore)
 Brügger & Thomet
 Assault Rifles
 APC223/556
 Battle Rifles
 APC308
 Pistols
 Brügger & Thomet USW-P
 Brügger & Thomet USW-SF
 Pistol calibre carbines
 GHM9
 SPC9
 Sniper rifles
 APR308
 APR308/338
 SPR300
 Submachine Gun
 Brügger & Thomet APC
 Brügger & Thomet KH9
 Brügger & Thomet MP5 (Switzerland - Submachine Gun - 9×19mm Parabellum: Heckler & Koch MP5 Variant)
 Brügger & Thomet MP9
 Brügger & Thomet TP380
 Brunswick Corporation
 Brunswick machine gun (US - Machine Gun - 5.56×45mm NATO / 7.62×51mm NATO)
 Brunswick RAW (US - Grenade Launcher - )
 BS-1 Tishina	(Russia - Integrally Suppressed Underslung Grenade Launcher - 30mm Grenade)
 BSP Planning and Design Pty. Ltd.
 Gordon Close-Support Weapon System	(Australia - Exotic Firearms Platform)
 CSWS Assault Rifle	(Australia - Assault Rifle - 5.56×45mm NATO)
 CSWS Battle Rifle	(Australia - Battle Rifle / Light Machine Gun - 7.62×51mm NATO)
 CSWS Shotgun	(Australia - Shotgun - 12 Gauge)
 CSWS Submachine Gun	(Australia - Submachine Gun - 9×19mm Parabellum)
 BSW Model 1	(Germany - Anti-Tank Rifle - 15mm)
 BTS-203	(Thailand - Underslung Grenade Launcher - 40×46mm SR)
 BUL Transmark
 Pistols
 BUL M5	(Israel - Semi-Automatic Pistol - 9×19mm Parabellum, 9×21mm IMI, 9×23mm Winchester, .40 S&W, .45 ACP: Colt M1911 Variant)
 BUL M5 Classic 1911	(Israel - Semi-Automatic Pistol - 9×19mm Parabellum, 9×21mm IMI, .40 S&W, .45 ACP)
 BUL M5 Classic C1911	(Israel - Semi-Automatic Pistol - 9×19mm Parabellum, 9×21mm IMI, .40 S&W, .45 ACP)
 BUL M5 Classic G1911	(Israel - Semi-Automatic Pistol - 9×19mm Parabellum, 9×21mm IMI, .40 S&W, .45 ACP)
 BUL M5 Classic U1911	(Israel - Semi-Automatic Pistol - 9×19mm Parabellum, 9×21mm IMI, .40 S&W, .45 ACP)
 BUL M5 Government	(Israel - Semi-Automatic Pistol - 9×19mm Parabellum, 9×21mm IMI, 9×23mm Winchester, .40 S&W, .45 ACP)
 BUL M5 Commander	(Israel - Semi-Automatic Pistol - 9×19mm Parabellum, 9×21mm IMI, 9×23mm Winchester, .40 S&W, .45 ACP)
 BUL M5 SAS	(Israel - Semi-Automatic Pistol - 9×19mm Parabellum, 9×21mm IMI, .40 S&W, .45 ACP)
 BUL M5 Carry	(Israel - Compact Semi-Automatic Pistol - 9×19mm Parabellum, 9×21mm IMI, .40 S&W, .45 ACP)
 BUL Cherokee	(Israel - Semi-Automatic Pistol - 9×19mm Parabellum)
 BUL Cherokee Compact	(Israel - Compact Semi-Automatic Pistol - 9×19mm Parabellum)
 BUL Cherokee FS	(Israel - Semi-Automatic Pistol - 9×19mm Parabellum)
 BUL Storm	(Israel - Semi-Automatic Pistol - 9×19mm Parabellum)
 Bundeswehr Small Arms Designations
 Rifles
 G22	(Germany/United Kingdom of Great Britain and Northern Ireland - Bundeswehr/Accuracy International - 2001 - Bolt-Action Sniper Rifle - .300 Winchester Magnum: German variant of the Accuracy International Arctic Warfare Magnum Folding bolt-action sniper rifle. Features telescopic sights made by Carl Zeiss AG.)
 G24	(Germany/United Kingdom of Great Britain and Northern Ireland - Bundeswehr/Accuracy International - 2000 - Bolt-Action Anti-Materiel Rifle - .50 BMG: German variant of the Accuracy International Arctic Warfare .50 bolt-action anti-materiel rifle.)
 G25	(Germany/United Kingdom of Great Britain and Northern Ireland - Bundeswehr/Accuracy International - 2002 - Bolt-Action Sniper Rifle - 7.62×51mm NATO, .308 Winchester: German variant of the British Accuracy International Arctic Warfare Covert bolt-action sniper rifle. In service with the special forces unit Kommando Spezialkräfte.)
 Burnside Carbine	(US - Breech-Loaded Carbine - Burnside Brass Cartridge)
 Bushmaster Firearms International
 Pistols
 Bushmaster Arm Pistol	(US - Semi-Automatic Pistol - 5.56×45mm NATO)
 Rifles
 Bushmaster ACR	(US, Poland - Semi-Automatic Rifle - 5.56×45mm NATO: Magpul Masada Civilian Variant)
 Bushmaster ACR DMR	(US, Poland - Designated Marksman Rifle - 5.56×45mm NATO)
 Bushmaster DCM	(US - Semi-Automatic Rifle - 5.56×45mm NATO)
 Bushmaster DCM-XR	(US - Semi-Automatic Rifle - 5.56×45mm NATO)
 Bushmaster XM-15 (US - Semi-Automatic Carbine - 5.56×45mm NATO, .223 Remington)
 Bushmaster M4 Type Carbine	(US - Semi-Automatic Carbine - 5.56×45mm NATO, .223 Remington)
 Bushmaster 7.62×39mm Carbine	(US - Semi-Automatic Carbine - 7.62×39mm)
 Bushmaster M4 Type Post-Ban Carine	(US - Semi-Automatic Carbine - 5.56×45mm NATO)
 Bushmaster M4A2 Carbine	(US - Semi-Automatic Carbine - 5.56×45mm NATO)
 Bushmaster M4A3 Carbine	(US - Semi-Automatic Carbine - 5.56×45mm NATO)
 Bushmaster Patrolman's Carbine	(US - Semi-Automatic Carbine - 5.56×45mm NATO)
 Bushmaster SPC Carbine	(US - Semi-Automatic Carbine - 6.8mm Remington SPC)
 Bushmaster M17	(US - Semi-Automatic Rifle - 5.56×45mm NATO)
 Bushmaster M17A1	(US - Semi-Automatic Rifle - 5.56×45mm NATO)
 Bushmaster M17A2	(US - Semi-Automatic Rifle - 5.56×45mm NATO)
 Bushmaster M17A3	(US - Semi-Automatic Rifle - 5.56×45mm NATO)
 Bushmaster M17A4	(US - Semi-Automatic Rifle - 5.56×45mm NATO)
 Bushmaster M17 Sniper	(US - Semi-Automatic Sniper Rifle - 5.56×45mm NATO)
 Bushmaster M17S	(US - Semi-Automatic Rifle - 5.56×45mm NATO)
 Bushmaster V Match 20	(US - Semi-Automatic Rifle - 5.56×45mm NATO)
 Bushmaster V Match 16	(US - Semi-Automatic Carbine - 5.56×45mm NATO)

See also
 List of firearms by era
 List of pre-20th century firearms
 List of World War II firearms
 List of firearms by country
 List of modern Russian small arms
 Lists of firearms by actions
 List of blow forward firearms
 List of delayed blowback firearms
 List of firearms by type
 List of assault rifles
 List of battle rifles
 List of carbines
 List of firearm brands
 List of flamethrowers
 List of machine guns
 List of multiple-barrel firearms
 List of pistols
 List of shotguns
 List of sniper rifles
 List of submachine guns
 List of firearm cartridges
 List of handgun cartridges
 List of rifle cartridges
 List of semi-automatic firearms
 List of semi-automatic pistols
 List of semi-automatic rifles
 List of semi-automatic shotguns
 List of most-produced firearms

References

B